Karl Joppich (6 January 1908 – 15 July 1940) was a German international footballer.

References

1908 births
1940 deaths
Association football midfielders
German footballers
Germany international footballers